is a theme park in Yokohama, Kanagawa Prefecture, Japan. It contains the Cosmo Clock 21, formerly the tallest Ferris wheel in the world. It is home to a dive coaster, Diving Coaster: Vanish.

External links

 

Tourist attractions in Yokohama
Amusement parks in Japan
Amusement parks opened in 1990
Minato Mirai 21
1990 establishments in Japan